Destriero is a  long,  wide, 400-ton displacement, yacht built by Fincantieri in their Muggiano yard at La Spezia in 1991. Destriero was built with the sponsorship of the Aga Khan IV and others specifically to cross the Atlantic Ocean in record time of 3 days and secure the Blue Riband.

In 1992 Destriero crossed the Atlantic, without refuelling, twice, firstly westbound from Tarifa Point, Spain to Ambrose Light, New York. Despite the record time of 58 hours, 34 minutes and 5 seconds, Destriero was denied the Hales Trophy, because she was classed as a "private yacht" and not a "commercial passenger vessel". Destriero did, however receive the Virgin Atlantic Challenge Trophy, awarded by former record-holder Richard Branson for the fastest crossing by any vessel, and the Columbus Atlantic Trophy sponsored by the Costa Smeralda and New York Yacht Clubs for the fastest trans-Atlantic round-trip. 

The ship was laid up in HMNB Devonport dockyard, Plymouth, England for ten years, but was removed in February 2009, reportedly for Lürssen ship yard.

References

External links
 Ships Registry Information
 Info Page for Motor Yacht DESTRIERO by Fincantieri Yachts - Fincantieri Cantieri Navali Italiani

Motor yachts
Ships built by Fincantieri